Porte de la Villette is a station of the Paris Métro. The origin of the commune of the Villette was a Gallo-Roman village, which grew up on the Roman road that led to east Flanders. About 1198, it became Ville Neuve Saint-Ladre and by 1426 it was called Villette-Saint-Miser-lez-Paris. The commune became a part of Paris in 1860. The nearby gate in Paris' 19th century walls hence became known as the Porte de la Villette.

The nearby Cité des Sciences et de l'Industrie, located in the Parc de la Villette, is the biggest science museum in Europe. The glass and steel building was designed by Peter Rice and it was opened in 1986.

The station is featured in Battlefield 3, in which it is featured in a multiplayer map.

History 
Porte de la Villette opened on 5 November 1910 with the commissioning of the first section of line 7 from Opéra with service provided by all trains on the line until 18 January 1911, when a branch opened from Louis Blanc to Pré-Saint-Gervais, resulting in 1 of every 2 trains serving this branch. It was once again served by all trains on the line when the branch from Louis Blanc to Pré-Saint-Gervais was split to form an independent line, line 7bis, on 3 December 1967 as a result of an imbalance in traffic between the two branches – the branch to Porte de la Villette having significantly higher traffic due to its role as an important terminus for many suburban buses. It served as the northern terminus of line 7 until 1979 when it was extended to Fort d'Aubervilliers. As part of the "Un métro + beau" programme by the RATP, the station was renovated and modernised on 16 January 2002.

In 2019, the station was used by 3,209,252 passengers, making it the 110th busiest of the Métro network, out of 302 stations.

In 2020, the station was used by 1,981,878 passengers amidst the COVID-19 pandemic, making it the 123th busiest of the Métro network, out of 305 stations.

An interchange with Paris tramway Line 3b opened on 15 December 2012, serving as its western terminus until its extension to Porte d'Asnières—Marguerite Long on 24 November 2018.

Passenger services

Access 
The station has 5 entrances:
 Access 1: avenue Corentin Cariou
 Access 2: boulevard Macdonald - Cité des Sciences et de l'Industrie
 Access 3: rue du Chemin-de-Fer - Centre d'Événements
 Access 4: avenue de la Porte-de-la-Villette
 Access 5: Parvis de la Cité - Cité des Sciences et de l'Industrie - Centre de Loisirs et de Commerce

Station layout

Platforms 
The station has, as does Porte de Pantin located on the same line, a particular arrangement specific to the stations serving or had served as a terminus. It has 2 identical half-stations each with an island platform surrounded by two tracks, the same layout as Château de Vincennes on line 1 and Porte de Champerret on line 3. As it was a former terminus, a turning loop is provided beyond the station towards La Courneuve–8 mai 1945. It is also where the sole connection to the La Villette workshops is in the métro, where equipment used to maintain the network (sleepers, switches, rails, etc.) are stored.

Other connections 
The station is also served by lines 71, 139, 150, and 152 of the RATP bus network, and at night, by lines N42 and N140 of the Noctilien bus network.

Gallery

References

Roland, Gérard (2003). Stations de métro. D’Abbesses à Wagram. Éditions Bonneton.

Paris Métro stations in the 19th arrondissement of Paris
Railway stations in France opened in 1910